Georges Stanislas Malif Dinga-Pinto (born 6 April 1994), better known by the stage name Niska, is a French rapper from Évry, Essonne. He is signed to Universal Music France and Barclay Records. He was initially in the rap group Negro Deep before going solo. Niska is a derivative of his nickname Stany in reverse (Nista), replacing the "t" with a "k". Niska has released four albums, Charo Life (2015), Zifukoro (2016), Commando (2017), Mr Sal (2019), and Le monde est méchant (2021) with the first two reaching number 3 on SNEP, the official French Albums chart and the third and fourth topping the French chart.

Biography
Niska was born to Congolese parents in Évry, Essonne, in the southern suburbs of Paris. In 2010, he became a father at the age of 16.

Discography

Albums

Singles

*Did not appear in the official Belgian Ultratop 50 charts, but rather in the bubbling under Ultratip charts.

Other charting songs

*Did not appear in the official Belgian Ultratop 50 charts, but rather in the bubbling under Ultratip charts.

As featured artist

*Did not appear in the official Belgian Ultratop 50 charts, but rather in the bubbling under Ultratip charts.

References

External links
Niska Twitter page

French rappers
1994 births
Living people
French people of Republic of the Congo descent
Rappers from Essonne
Black French musicians